Daqiao Township is a township in an oasis in the north of the Tarim Basin, administratively part of Baicheng County, Aksu Prefecture, in west-central Xinjiang, China; it is situated, as the crow flies, about  southwest of the county seat and  northeast of Aksu City, the prefectural seat. , it has nine villages and one residential zone under its administration.

See also 
 List of township-level divisions of Xinjiang

References 

Township-level divisions of Xinjiang
Baicheng County